The 1967 Fitzgibbon Cup was the 54th staging of the Fitzgibbon Cup since its establishment by the Gaelic Athletic Association in 1912. Trinity College Dublin hosted the cup from 4 to 5 March 1967.

University College Cork were the defending champions.

On 5 March 1967, University College Cork won the Fitzgibbon Cup after beating University College Galway by 3–17 to 2–05 in the final. This was their 21st cup title overall and their second title in succession.

Results

Semi-finals

Final

References

Fitzgibbon
Fitzgibbon Cup